Oil Ridge is a ridge in the U.S. state of West Virginia.

Oil Ridge was named for oil production in the area.

References

Landforms of Ritchie County, West Virginia
Ridges of West Virginia